The Johor Bahru Prison, in Johor Bahru, Johor, Malaysia, was opened in 1883 to incarcerate criminals in the State, as well as those who revolted against the British colonial government. The prison, located on 4.5 acres (18,000 m²) of prime land in the city area, was served by three roads, namely, Jalan Ayer Molek, Jalan Gertak Merah, and Jalan Khalid Abdullah. On August 30, 2005, the prison's operations were relocated to Kluang in Central Johore, due to the very acute space shortage.

The prison complex
The Johor Bahru Prison was designed by the then sultan, Sultan Ibrahim ibni Almarhum Sultan Abu Bakar ibni Almarhum Daeng Ibrahim, who visited the prisons in Shanghai and Osaka to study the physical condition and design of their prisons. The building contract was awarded to a prominent Chinese building contractor, Wong Ah Fook, on April 16, 1882.

The original built-in area was  square (15,000 m²), with a capacity of 200 inmates. There were then only two accommodation blocks for inmates, two training workshops, a kitchen, a toilet block, a clinic and an administrative office.

With the pressing need to increase its capacity over the years,  buildings were added, and existing ones, renovated. The number of accommodation blocks for inmates gradually increased to ten, with a capacity of 1,500 inmates. The number of training workshops had also increased to five. Added too, were additional facilities and amenities, which included a family visiting area, a counselling clinic, a welfare officer's room, and a praying room (surau). The 4.5 acre (18,000 m²) compound, enclosed by a 20 feet (6 m) high wall, remained as it was in 1883. The area surrounding the prison had been fully developed, with staff quarters, occupying 9.4 acres (38,000 m²). Thus, every available space within the compound had to be fully utilized. Buildings were packed so close to each other, that one wonders whether fire regulations had been infringed. Even so, inmates had to be crammed up to seven or eight to a cell, when these were originally designed for three.

Capital and corporal punishment

Death sentences were not carried out at the prison. Remand inmates sentenced to death by hanging were sent to the main prison in Kuala Lumpur, the national capital. However, corporal punishment (caning on the bare buttocks) was administered at Johor Bahru Prison on Mondays and Thursdays.

 See Caning in Malaysia

General Yamashita Well

This historical well was built at the time the prison was constructed in 1882 as a source of drinking water. According to accounts narrated by ex-staff of the prison, the well was used as an execution ground by General Tomoyuki Yamashita, during the Japanese occupation during World War II. It is popularly believed to be haunted.

Exhibition

After the prison's operations were relocated to Kluang, the Prison Authorities organized an "open house" and exhibition from September 1 to December 15, 2005 at the Johor Bahru Prison. The objective of the exhibition was to create public awareness of the conditions of life within the prison, via a talk, a video show, a caning demonstration, and an opportunity to see the prison facilities, first hand. Entry tickets were charged at RM5.00 for adults and RM2.00 for children (7–17 years old).

See also

 Law enforcement in Malaysia

References 

 Exhibition Brochure published by Penjara Johor Bahru, and information from the video and demo presentation (September 6, 2005).

1882 establishments in British Malaya
2005 disestablishments in Malaysia
British colonial prisons in Asia
Buildings and structures in Johor Bahru
Defunct prisons in Malaysia